Dictyopharinae is a subfamily of dictyopharid planthoppers in the family Dictyopharidae. There more than 100 genera and 500 described species in Dictyopharinae.

Tribes and genera
Dictyopharinae contains 13 extant tribes:

Aluntiini
Authority: Emeljanov, 1979; distribution: Africa, Asia
 Aluntia Stål, 1866 - type genus, tropical Africa
 Dendrophora Melichar, 1903 - Sri Lanka, W. Malesia
 Dictyomorpha Melichar, 1912 - China, Indochina, Malesia
 Indodictyophara Liang & Song, 2012 - India
 Madagascaritia Song & Liang, 2016 - Madagascar

Arjunini 
Authority: Song & Szwedo, 2016; distribution: Malesia, New Guinea
 Arjuna Muir, 1934 c g
 Pippax Emeljanov, 2008

Capenini 
Authority: Emeljanov, 1969; distribution: S. Africa
 Capena Stål, 1866 c g
 Diasphax Fennah, 1962
 Menenches Fennah, 1962

Cleotychini
Authority: Emeljanov, 1997; distribution: Australia
 Cleotyche Emeljanov, 1997

Dictyopharini 
Authority: Spinola, 1839; distribution: Africa, Europe, Asia

 Aethiocera Emeljanov, 2008
 Afronersia Fennah, 1958
 Aselgeia Walker, 1851
 Avephora Bierman, 1910
 Callodictya Melichar, 1912
 Carphotoma Emeljanov, 2008
 Chiltana Shakila & Akbar, 1995
 Cormophana Emeljanov, 2011
 Daploce Emeljanov, 2008
 Dictyohimalaya Song & Liang, 2020
 Dictyophara Germar, 1833 c g
 Doryphorina Melichar, 1912
 Emeljanovina Xing & Chen, 2013
 Engela Distant, 1906 c g
 Gilgitia Shakila, 1991
 Indrival Fennah, 1978
 Issomimus Jacobi in Sjöstedt, 1910
 Mathetris Emeljanov, 2011
 Neodictya Synave, 1965 g
 Neodictyophara Distant, 1910
 Neomiasa Fennah, 1947
 Paradictya Melichar, 1912
 Paradictyopharina Song & Liang, 2011
 Paranagnia Melichar, 1912
 Philotheria Melichar, 1912
 Pseudophanella Fennah, 1958
 Putala Melichar, 1903
 Raivuna Fennah, 1978
 Raphiophora Schaum, 1851
 Rhaba Distant, 1906 c g
 Sinodictya Matsumura, 1940
 Tenguella Matsumura, 1909 c g
 Tropidophara Bierman, 1910
 Tupala Stroinski & Szwedo, 2015
 Tylacra Emeljanov, 2008
 Zaputala Emeljanov, 2008
 Zedochir Fennah, 1978

Hastini 

Authority: Emeljanov, 1983; distribution: Australia, Pacific
 Anasta Emeljanov, 2008
 Articrius Emeljanov, 2008
 Dorimargus Melichar, 1912
 Eudictya Melichar, 1912
 Hasta Kirkaldy, 1906 c g
 Thanatodictya Kirkaldy, 1906

Lappidini 

Authority: Emeljanov, 1983; distribution: S. America
 Hydriena Melichar, 1912
 Igava Melichar, 1912
 Lappida Amyot & Audinet-Serville, 1843
 Toropa Melichar, 1912

Nersiini 

Authority: Emeljanov, 1983; distribution: Americas
 Coronersia Emeljanov, 2011
 Crocodictya Emeljanov, 2008
 Deltoplana Emeljanov, 2011
 Dictyopharoides Fowler, 1900
 Digitocrista Fennah, 1944
 Hyalodictyon Fennah, 1944
 Malogava Emeljanov, 2008
 Megadictya Melichar, 1912
 Melicharoptera Metcalf, 1938
 Mitrops Fennah, 1944
 Neonotostrophia Xing & Chen, 2013 c g
 Neoterpe Emeljanov, 2011 c g
 Nersia Stal, 1862 c g b
 Nersiella Emeljanov, 2008
 Parahasta Melichar, 1912
 Paralappida Melichar, 1912
 Pharodictyon Fennah, 1944
 Plegmatoptera Spinola, 1839
 Pteroplegma Melichar, 1912
 Pukuakanga Baptista, Serrão & Da-Silva, 2010
 Retiala Fennah, 1944
 Rhynchomitra Fennah, 1944 c g b
 Sicoris Stål, 1866 c g
 Taractellus Metcalf, 1948
 Trigava O'Brien, 1999
 Trimedia Fennah, 1944 c g
 Xenochasma Emeljanov, 2011

Orthopagini 

Authority: Emeljanov, 1983; distribution: Africa, Europe, Asia
 Centromeria Stål, 1870
 Centromeriana Melichar, 1912
 Dictyomeria Song, Webb & Liang, 2016
 Dictyopharina Melichar, 1903
 Dictyotenguna Song & Liang c g
 Ellipoma Emeljanov, 2008
 Fernandea Melichar, 1912
 Indomiasa Song, Webb & Liang, 2014
 Leprota Melichar, 1912
 Litocras Emeljanov, 2008
 Macronaso Synave, 1960
 Medeusa Emeljanov, 2011
 Metaurus Stål, 1866 c g
 Miasa Distant, 1906 c g
 Neonersia Song & Deckert, 2019
 Nesolyncides Fennah, 1958
 Orthopagus Uhler, 1896 c g
 Phaenodictyon Fennah, 1958
 Protolepta Melichar, 1912
 Saigona Matsumura, 1910
 Tenguna Matsumura, 1910
 Truncatomeria Song & Liang, 2011

Phylloscelini 

Authority: Emeljanov, 1983; distribution: N. America, Africa
 Phylloscelis Germar, 1839 c g b

Rancodini 
Authority: Emeljanov, 2014; distribution: Chile
 Rancoda Emeljanov, 2014 c g

Scoloptini 

Authority: Emeljanov, 1983; distribution: N. America
 Scolops Schaum in Ersch & Gruber, 1850 c g b

Taosini 
Authority: Emeljanov, 1983; distribution: Americas
 Brachytaosa Muir, 1931
 Cuernavaca (planthopper) Kirkaldy, 1913
 Netaosa Emeljanov, 2011
 Phormotegus Emeljanov, 2010
 Sicorisia Melichar, 1912
  Taosa Distant, 1906 c g

Genera incertae sedis
 Chondrodire Emeljanov, 2011
 Chondrophana Emeljanov, 2015
 Mahanorona Distant, 1909
 Viridophara Shakila, 1984

Extinct genera

 Orthopagini
 † Alicodoxa Emeljanov & Shcherbakov, 2011
 † Bathymyza Emeljanov & Shcherbakov, 2020
 †Netutelini Emeljanov, 1983
 † Netutela Emeljanov, 1983
 †Worskaitini Szwedo, 2008
 † Worskaito Szwedo, 2008
 	
Data sources: i = ITIS, c = Catalogue of Life, g = GBIF, b = Bugguide.net

References

Further reading

External links
FLOW: Subfamily Dictyopharinae Spinola, 1839 
 
 
 

 
Dictyopharidae
Hemiptera subfamilies